Blush is a 1995 Chinese film about the experience of two women during China's campaign to re-educate prostitutes. Blush was directed by Li Shaohong and stars He Saifei, Wang Ji, and Wang Zhiwen. The film was a co-production between Hong Kong's Ocean Film and Beijing Film Studio. The film is based on the novel Petulia's Rouge Tin (in Chinese, named Hóng​fěn) by the writer Su Tong. Blush won the Silver Bear for Outstanding Single Achievement at the 45th Berlin International Film Festival, and Golden Peacock (Best Film) at the 27th International Film Festival of India.

Plot 
Blush takes place in the 1950s during a campaign by the new Communist government in China designed to "re-educate" prostitutes to become contributing members of society. Two such prostitutes, Xiao'e (He Saifei) and Qiuyi (Wang Ji), have recently been sent to a re-education camp by the People's Liberation Army. Rebelling against her new life of uniforms and forced re-education, Qiuyi escapes and becomes a kept woman for Laopu (Wang Zhiwen). When Qiuyi becomes pregnant, she seeks refuge in a Buddhist temple but is cast out when the nuns discover her pregnancy - soon after, the baby miscarries.

Left in the training camp, Xiao'e undergoes her ideological re-education and emerges from her ordeal as a factory worker. Detesting physical labor, she goes on to marry Laopu and has a child with him, forcing him to steal money from work. When Laopu is caught, he is sentenced to death, and Xiao'e abandons him and her child to remarry. As the film ends, Xiao'E's child is adopted by Qiuyi, who had gone on to marry a simple old teahouse owner.

Reception 
Blush was well received by most critics in the West, with Jonathan Rosenbaum of the Chicago Reader calling it the "most emotionally complex picture I've seen from mainland China about the effect of the communist revolution on the lives of ordinary people."

Notes

Names in native languages

References

External links 
 
 
 Blush at the Chinese Movie Database

1995 films
Films about prostitution in China
1995 drama films
1990s Mandarin-language films
Films set in the 1950s
Films directed by Li Shaohong
Beijing Film Studio films
Chinese drama films
Films scored by Guo Wenjing